The George Wyth Memorial State Park is a state park of Iowa in the United States. The park was dedicated in 1940 as "Josh Higgins Parkway", named for a popular radio character of the day. In 1956, it was renamed George Wyth Memorial State Park after a well-known Cedar Falls businessman and conservationist.

The park is located near Waterloo and Cedar Falls. Its large expanse of woodland is abundant with many varieties of wildlife. Bird-watchers have observed more than 200 different species and white-tailed deer can be seen year-round. The park has been designated as a National Urban Wildlife Sanctuary.

Camping
The campground has 69 camping units with modern showers, rest rooms and a trailer dump station. Advance campsite reservations can be booked through the park reservation system. Half of the campsites are available for self-registration on a first-come, first-served basis, while the remainder require reservations.

Trails
George Wyth has  of paved multi-purpose trails created for biking, in-line skating and walking. These trails are linked to a  trail network within the cities of Waterloo and Cedar Falls. George Wyth also has  of grass hiking trails. In winter, sports such as cross-country skiing, and snowmobiling are also popular.

The Lake-to-Lake State Park Bike Route is a  route connecting Pine Lake and George Wyth Memorial State Parks. This route primarily utilizes county highways, and established bike routes and paths once inside Cedar Falls/Waterloo.

Lake
The park is unique in that it has several water areas: Brinker Lake (120 acres, open for power boating), George Wyth Lake (75 acres, no wake lake with handicap accessible fishing pier and fishing jetties), Fisher Lake (40 acre natural lake), Alice Wyth Lake (60 acres, electric motors only) and the Cedar River. Sailboating and windsurfing are also popular. George Wyth beach is a popular swimming spot in the community. The lakes and river provides anglers a variety of fish. Boat ramps are available on the river and lakes.

References

External links
 George Wyth Memorial State Park

State parks of Iowa
Protected areas established in 1940
Protected areas of Black Hawk County, Iowa